The Type 05 amphibious armored vehicle is a family of amphibious tracked armored fighting vehicles developed by Norinco for the People's Liberation Army Navy Marine Corps, consisting of two main combat variants — the ZBD-05 infantry fighting vehicle and the ZTD-05 assault vehicle, as well as several support variants based on the ZBD-05. The Type 05s could be launched at sea from an amphibious assault ship over the horizon, and features a hydroplane, a design concept that has been compared to the cancelled United States Expeditionary Fighting Vehicle (EFV) program.

As a dedicated amphibious combat vehicle, the Type 05 is aiming to provide unique amphibious capability that emphasizes speedy landing operations. China is the only country to produce such unique high-speed amphibious fighting vehicles.

Development

Type 05 family is developed in early 2000s by Chinese state-owned defense company Norinco, led by chief designer Chen Pengfei. Two variants of the vehicle family was developed first, the infantry fighting variant ZBD-05, and assault gun/light tank variant ZTD-05. ZBD-05 vehicles were showcased in military parade of 2009 and 2015.

The Type 05 amphibious infantry fighting vehicle uses a planing hull propelled by two water jets, which is a considerable improvement over similar type of vehicle like AAV7A1 amphibious assault vehicle (AAV). United States’s cancellation of Expeditionary Fighting Vehicle (EFV) leaves China the only country to produce vehicle with such unique concept.

The ZTD-05 assault vehicle variant replaces the obsolete Type 63A amphibious tank introduced in the late 1990s. Research and development effort is reflected on the capable design. The vehicle implicates China is determined to secure advanced amphibious assault capabilities.

Design

Mobility 
The Type 05 features a flat hull, extendable bow, with six retractable road wheels on each side and front/rear rollers. The vehicle's design results in significantly reduced drag. The angle of the bow changes adaptively according to the current displacement speedometer so that fluid resistance can always be kept at the lowest, optimal level. 

The ZBD-05 is fully amphibious, which propelled by two large water jets mounted to the rear side of the hull. In the water, the engine is able to generate 1475 horsepower as well as switching to land mode with only 550 horsepower. The vehicle can run at a maximum road speed of 65 km/h and 30 km/h in the water. It has a maximum cruising range of 500 km and can negotiate a gradient of 60 % and side slope of 30%. It can cross a vertical obstacle of 0.7 m and trench of 2m.

Armament 

The Infantry Fighting Vehicle (IFV) variant, ZBD-05, is built to support infantry and amphibious operations. The 3-man crew consists of the driver positioned front-left of the turret, with commander and gunner occupying the turret. The vehicle features ZPT-99 30mm cannon turret with a HJ-73C ATGM rail launcher, capable of penetrating more than 800mm RHA after ERA. The vehicle can carry 7 to 8 (one squad) armed infantry in its passenger compartment at the rear.

The Assault Vehicle (light tank) variant, ZTD-05, is armed with a fully stabilized ZPL-98A 105mm rifled gun. The ZTD-05 assault vehicle variant has a crew of four, including a loader. The type of APFSDS round fitted on ZTD-05 is the DTC02-105 armor piercing fin stabilized discarding sabot based on BTA-2 105mm APFSDS, capable of penetrating 600mm RHA at 2,000 meters. The rifled gun is also capable of launching laser guided beam-riding missile. The gun is loaded manually with a fire rate of 6 to 8 rounds per minute with 36 rounds ammo reserve. ZTD-05's turret shares a similar layout to the ZTL-11 assault vehicle.

Secondary weapons for both variants include a Type 86 7.62mm coaxial mounted machine gun. ZTD-15 features a QJC-88 12.7mm anti-aircraft machine gun mounted on the roof of the turret near the loader.

Fire control
Accuracy and precision are attained by a computerized fire-control system (FCS) on both ZBD-05 and ZTD-05. The fire control system includes a fire-control ballistic computer, laser rangefinder, two-plane stabilization, and daylight/infrared gunner sight with passive night vision channel. Commander has access to day/night independent thermal sight with hunter-killer (commander override) capability.

Type 05 is fitted with battle management system, command and control system, digital map interface. All the necessary information is displayed on screens to the driver, commander, and gunner. ZTD-05 is equipped with laser designator for beam-riding SACLOS applications, and loader position is also fitted with an independent periscope.

Protection
The vehicle has satellite navigation, fire suppression system, NBC protection system, day/night thermal vision, ensuring high degree of survivability for the crew. The hull is constructed with aluminum alloy chassis with additional steel glacis plates. Aluminum alloy reduces weight and provides protection against small arms rounds and shell splatter, while the steel plates can stop 12.7mm rounds. The turret is constructed of all-welded steel armor with composite plates, which gives all-around protection against 12.7mm rounds and shell splinters. The upper part of the suspension is protected by armor plates.

Both ZBD-05 and ZTD-05 are fitted with laser warning receivers, which are connected to 2 sets of 4-barrel smoke grenade launchers. The storage area around the aft section double as slat armor.

Deployment
Type 05 amphibious fighting vehicles are deployed by People's Liberation Army Ground Force amphibious assault brigades and People's Liberation Army Navy Marine Corps.

Variants
Type 05 (ZTD-05 or ZLT-05) Amphibious Assault Vehicle The assault gun variant, armed with a ZPL98A 105mm low-recoil rifled gun, a 7.62mm coaxial machine gun, and QJC-88 12.7mm anti-aircraft machine gun. An improved variant, designated ZLT-05A, with upgraded computer system and digital terminals accessible for driver, gunner, and commander.
Type 05 (ZBD-05) Amphibious Infantry Fighting Vehicle The infantry fighting vehicle variant, armed with a ZPT-99 30mm autocannon, a 7.62mm coaxial machine gun, and HJ-73C anti-tank missiles.
Type 05 (ZSD-05) Amphibious Armored Personal Carrier The armored personal carrier variant, armed with plate-protected 12.7mm heavy machine gun turret.
Type 05 Amphibious Armored Reconnaissance Vehicle The Armoured reconnaissance variant, equipped with telescopic mast with electro-optical and infrared (EO/IR) system, a laser-range finder, and an X-band radar. The variant has 12.7 mm heavy machine gun turret for defense.
Type 05 Amphibious Armored Command Vehicle The mobile command and control variant, equipped with field communication and battle management system.
Type 05 Amphibious Armored Recovery Vehicle The armoured recovery vehicle variant, equipped with a crane, hydraulic winch for emergency vehicle recovery. Additional handrail is installed on the top for ease of operation in the water.
Type 05 Assault Breach Vehicle The mine clearance assaults vehicle variants. It is equipped with mine plow, mine detection device, and rocket-projected mine clearing line charge (MICLIC).
Type 05 Amphibious Armored Ambulance Armored ambulance variant based on Type 05 command vehicle chassis, providing frontline medical support and evacuation. The armored ambulance features emergency ventilator, air conditioning, monitoring, and shock-absorbing double bunk beds.
VN16 Modified export variants of the ZTD-05.
VN18 Modified export variants of the ZBD-05.
VS25 Modified export variants of the Type 05 Amphibious Armored Recovery Vehicle.

Operators
 
People's Liberation Army Ground Force: 1,150+ units in service as of 2021. 900 units of ZBD-05; 250 units of ZTD-05; Uncounted units of other variants.
People's Liberation Army Navy Marine Corps: 320+ units in service as of 2021. 240 units of ZBD-05; 80 units of ZTD-05; Uncounted units of other variants.
 : Adopted the VN16, VN18. and VS25 for the Venezuelan Marine Corps.
 : 3 ordered in June 2020 at approximate cost of USD 13 million for the Royal Thai Marine Corps and delivered in May 2021.

See also 
 List of modern armored fighting vehicles
Related development
 ZBD-03 - airborne combat vehicle developed by China
 ZBD-04 - tracked infantry fighting vehicle developed by China
 ZBL-08 - wheeled infantry fighting vehicle developed by China
Comparable ground systems 
 Expeditionary Fighting Vehicle
 Assault Amphibious Vehicle
 Amphibious Combat Vehicle

References

External links
https://web.archive.org/web/20130213000250/http://www.sinodefence.com/army/armour/zbd2000.asp
http://www.airforceworld.com/a/20150624/2305.html  (Simplified Chinese)

Amphibious armoured fighting vehicles
Amphibious tanks
Tracked armoured fighting vehicles
Light tanks of the People's Republic of China
Armoured fighting vehicles of the People's Republic of China
Tracked amphibious vehicles
Post–Cold War light tanks
Military vehicles introduced in the 2000s